Box Canyon Dam is a concrete gravity dam on the Upper Sacramento River impounding Lake Siskiyou reservoir, in Siskiyou County, northern California.

Description
The dam and reservoir are located in Box Canyon of the eastern Trinity Mountains and within the Shasta–Trinity National Forest, southwest of the town of Mount Shasta and Mount Shasta peak. 

The dam is owned and operated by Siskiyou County's Flood Control & Water Conservation District and Siskiyou Power Authority, and was completed in 1965 to provide flood control. In 1965, a powerhouse was installed to provide hydroelectric power.

Recreation
The Box Canyon Trail begins on the north side of Box Canyon Dam, following the Upper Sacramento River down the narrow canyon to the outskirts of the town of Mount Shasta. The Lake Siskiyou Trail encircles the lake, including a crossing atop the dam.

See also
 
 List of dams and reservoirs in California

References

External links
Living Shasta Photography Blog: Lake Siskiyou's Box Canyon Dam — photo gallery, interiors/exteriors of dam + powerhouse.
 

Dams in California
Dams on the Sacramento River
Buildings and structures in Siskiyou County, California
Gravity dams
United States local public utility dams
Trinity Mountains (California)
Dams completed in 1970
1970 establishments in California
Mount Shasta, California (city)
Shasta-Trinity National Forest